Marianna Nagy (born 21 July 1984) is a Hungarian short track speed skater. She competed in three events at the 2002 Winter Olympics.

References

External links
 

1984 births
Living people
Hungarian female short track speed skaters
Olympic short track speed skaters of Hungary
Short track speed skaters at the 2002 Winter Olympics
People from Jászberény
Sportspeople from Jász-Nagykun-Szolnok County
21st-century Hungarian women